Semyon Ulyanovich Remezov  (ca. 1642, Tobolsk - after 1720, Tobolsk) was a Russian historian, architect and geographer of Siberia. He is responsible for compiling three collections of maps, charts and drawings of Siberia, which effectively became atlases of the area.  Remezov's atlases were important to Peter the Great's imperial expansion into the eastern territory of Russia as they provided the Tsar with information on the Siberian landscape and the location of its indigenous communities. Such knowledge became necessary for future administrative and military projects in the area.

Remezov's cartography of Siberia blends traditional Russian map-making practices with those of modern science and the Enlightenment that were beginning to influence Russian culture at his time. For instance, Remezov's maps followed the Russian pattern of using river systems as a basis for design instead of astronomical points.  This resulted in many of his maps being oriented to the south instead of the north.  Yet he “wrote excessively in praise of the compass” and used universally accepted scales and measures in his atlases.

Remezov's cartography also shows the spread of Christianity across Siberia. In his maps, newly founded cities are represented by elaborate churches, and, as Remezov boasts in his writing: the Russians brought the “light of inexpressible joy” to Siberia. To Remezov, the Tsar's imperial conquest had a religious and missionary component as well, where land gained for Russia was likewise gained for God and his Church.

Remezov's lively and extensive body of work make him the preeminent, if not exclusive, source for Russian cartography in the late 17th and early 18th Centuries.

References

V.K. Ziborov (В.К.Зиборов),  Семен Ульянович Ремезов (Semyon Ulyanovich Remezov), in Словарь книжников и книжности древней Руси. (Dictionary of Book People and Book Culture of Old Russia), Vol. 3 (17th century), Part 3 (letters P through S). Saint Petersburg, Dmitry Bulanin Publishers, 1988. pp. 195–196.

Resources
Сибирь XVII века глазами современника. С.У. Ремезов и его "История Сибирская" (The 17th-century Siberia seen by a man of the times. S.U. Remezov and his "Siberian History")  (many illustrations)
The Atlas of Siberia by Semyon U. Remezov, facsimile ed., with an introduction by Leo Bagrow (S.-Gravenhage: Mouton, 1958)

Historians from the Russian Empire
Male writers from the Russian Empire
Cartographers from the Russian Empire
Explorers from the Russian Empire
Explorers of Siberia
1640s births
18th-century deaths
Year of birth uncertain
Year of death unknown
17th-century cartographers
18th-century cartographers
18th-century male writers
17th-century male writers